Fatherland Front may refer to:

 Fatherland Front (Austria), the ruling political organisation of Austrofascism, 1933–1938
 Fatherland Front (Bulgaria), a communist resistance movement during World War II, dissolved in 1990
 National Fatherland Front, an umbrella organization for the People's Democratic Party of Afghanistan
 United Democratic Fatherland Front, a North Korean united front led by the Workers' Party of Korea
 Vietnamese Fatherland Front, a pro-government umbrella group